Concannon (other spellings Concanen, Concanon, Conceanainn, Con Ceanainn, and Kincannon, among others) is an Irish family name, and may refer to:

 Brian Concannon
 Brian Concannon (hurler)
 Helena Concannon ( Walsh; 1878–1952), politician, historian, author and scholar.
 James Concannon (1890–1973), Australian politician
 John Concannon
 Eóin Concannon (died 1954), king of the Claddagh
 Paddy Concannon (1918–2012), president of the ITCCA
 Susan Concannon (born 1958), American politician

Other spellings
 Muirgeas ua Cú Ceanainn (died 1037), king of Uí Díarmata and chief of the name
 Richard Luke Concanen (1747–1810), first bishop of New York, 1808–1810
 Edmund Concanon (1816–1902), Irish solicitor and town commissioner
 Tomás Bán Ó Conceanainn (1870–1946), writer and historian

See also 
 Concannon Vineyard, a winery in Livermore Valley, California
 Kincannon, a surname and variant of Concannon
 Uí Díarmata

Surnames of Irish origin